The 2019 Russian Indoor Athletics Championships was the 28th edition of the annual indoor track and field competition organised by the All-Russia Athletic Federation (ARAF), which serves as the Russian national indoor championship for the sport. A total of 24 events (divided evenly between the sexes) were contested over three days from 13–15 February at the Alexander Gomelsky Universal Sports Hall CSKA in Moscow.

Due to ongoing international sanctions for doping against the Russian governing body, the competition did not serve as a selection meet for the 2019 European Athletics Indoor Championships.

In addition to the main track and field championship, national championship events were held separately for the indoor mile on 3 February in Moscow, and for combined track and field events from 13–16 February in Kirov.

The women's high jump saw world-class performances from Mariya Lasitskene and Anna Chicherova, both of whom cleared . Anzhelika Sidorova had her sixth consecutive win in the women's pole vault, while Vladimir Nikitin (3000 m) and Kristina Sivkova (60 m) each won their third national indoor titles.

Results

Men

Women

Russian Indoor Mile Championships
The Russian Indoor Mile Championships was held on 3 February 2019 in Moscow at the Alexander Gomelsky Universal Sports Hall CSKA. A total of 34 athletes from 16 regions of the country (20 men and 14 women) took to the start. Vladimir Nikitin set a new Russian indoor record of 3:54.77 minutes to win the men's race while runner-up Konstantin Plokhotnikov set a national youth record of 3:58.62 minutes. Svetlana Aplachkina won the women's race in 4:31.51 minutes.

Men

Women

Russian Combined Events Championships
The Russian Combined Events Championships were held from 13–16 February at the Veresniki Stadium in Kirov, Kirov Oblast. The leading men's athletes, Ilya Shkurenyov and Artyom Makarenko were both absent. Andrei Fomichev won his first title in the heptathlon, though his score of 5556 points was the lowest winning score in championship history. Maria Pavlova won her second national indoor title in the pentathlon.

Men

Women

References

Results

External links
Official website for Russian Athletics

Russian Indoor Athletics Championships
Russian Indoor Athletics Championships
Russian Indoor Athletics Championships
Russian Indoor Athletics Championships
Sports competitions in Moscow
Athletics in Moscow